The 2016–17 Toto Cup Al was the 32st season of the third-important football tournament in Israel since its introduction and the 11th tournament involving Israeli Premier League clubs only. 

The competition is held in two stages. First, fourteen Premier League teams were divided into three groups, five teams in groups A and B and four teams in group C, the teams playing against each other once. The best three teams from groups A and B and the best two teams from group C will advance to the quarter-finals, which will be played over two-legged ties. The semi-finals and the final are then played as one-legged matches in a neutral venue.

Hapoel Be'er Sheva won the cup by defeating Hapoel Kiryat Shmona 4–1 in the final.

Group stage
Groups were allocated according to geographic distribution of the clubs, with the northern clubs allocated to Group A (include team from Kfar Saba), In Group B allocated the three teams from Tel Aviv, one team from Petah Tikva and one more team from Ra'anana, the rest of the teams In Group C . 

The matches started July 30th.

Group A

Group B

Group C

Knockout rounds
All times are in Israel Standard Time

Quarter-finals

Semi-finals

Final

References

External links
 Official website  

Al
Toto Cup Al
Toto Cup Al